Wuhan Iron and Steel Company Limited known as WISCO (and formerly WGGF, abb. of ), is a subsidiary of listed steel maker Baoshan Iron and Steel; Wuhan Iron and Steel Co., Ltd. was a subsidiary of state-owned Wuhan Iron and Steel Corporation until 2016. The main business was the steel plant in Qingshan District, Wuhan, while the parent company had transformed from steel making company to holding company and M&A vehicle.

On 21–22 September 2016, a merger between Baosteel Group and Wuhan Iron and Steel Corporation was announced. Wuhan Iron and Steel Company Limited would be takeover by the listed counterpart of Baosteel Group in an all-share deal, while all the rights of Wuhan Iron and Steel Corporation would be transferred to Baosteel Group, as both corporations were supervised by the same entity State-owned Assets Supervision and Administration Commission of the State Council.

On 7 July 2016, after a heavy net loss in 2015, Wuhan Iron and Steel Corporation also announced the group would reduce their production capacity by 4.42 million metric tons, which Wuhan Iron and Steel Co Ltd would be cut 1.40 million metric tons, or about 31.7% of the group total.

Stock market
Wuhan Iron and Steel Co., Ltd. was a component of SSE 50 Index, which was removed in 2011.

The company was a component CSI 300 Index and its sub-index CSI 100 Index, which was removed from both indexes in 2013. In 2015, the company was re-added to CSI 300 Index.

References

External links
  

Companies formerly listed on the Shanghai Stock Exchange
Former companies in the CSI 100 Index
Former companies in the SSE 50 Index
Steel companies of China
Manufacturing companies based in Wuhan
Chinese companies established in 1997
Manufacturing companies established in 1997
Baowu
Government-owned companies of China
1997 establishments in China